Judith Margaret Bain (born 11 October 1944) is a British fencer. She competed in the women's individual and team foil events at the 1968 Summer Olympics. Bain won a silver medal at the 1970 Commonwealth Games in the women's foil team event.

References

External links
 

1944 births
Living people
British female fencers
Olympic fencers of Great Britain
Fencers at the 1968 Summer Olympics
People from Ross and Cromarty
Sportspeople from Highland (council area)
Commonwealth Games medallists in fencing
Commonwealth Games silver medallists for Scotland
Fencers at the 1970 British Commonwealth Games
Medallists at the 1970 British Commonwealth Games